This is a list of the stage works of the Brazilian-born composer Antônio Carlos Gomes (1836–1896).

List

References

Sources
Béhague, Gerard Henri (1992), "Gomes, Carlos" in The New Grove Dictionary of Opera, ed. Stanley Sadie (London) 
Some of the information in this article is taken from the related French Wikipedia article.

 
Lists of operas by composer
Lists of compositions by composer